Decide is an unincorporated community within Clinton County, Kentucky, United States. Its post office  is closed.

References

Unincorporated communities in Clinton County, Kentucky
Unincorporated communities in Kentucky